The Fashion Show: Ultimate Collection (originally styled as The Fashion Show) is an American reality television series which premiered on May 7, 2009, on the Bravo cable network. The show focuses on fashion design and features hosts fashion designer Isaac Mizrahi and supermodel Iman. The contestants compete against each other to create the best clothes. They are restricted in time, materials, and theme; the resulting designs are judged and one or more designers is eliminated each week. The show was originally co-hosted by singer Kelly Rowland; she was replaced by Iman in Season 2.

It replaced Bravo's first fashion-competition TV show Project Runway, following its move, accompanied by no small amount of controversy, to Lifetime.
Internationally the show was broadcast on Dutch television RTL 5 and was broadcast on British Pay-TV channel Really.  Bravo made no move to renew the show after the second season ended on 25 January 2011.

Format

Season 1

Season 1 features Kelly Rowland and Isaac Mizrahi as hosts. The hosts are also judges and are joined by Fern Mallis and Laura Brown in the judging panel.

Fifteen designers compete to win $125,000 and have their fashions sold in retail. America chose the winner as these designers were presented with challenges that tested their skill.

Season 2

New host Iman (who had previously hosted the Canadian edition of Project Runway), returning host Isaac Mizrahi (who would go on to judge Project Runways All-Star season), and returning judge Laura Brown of Harper's Bazaar gathered together as the second season introduced a new format. The contestants are split up into two fashion "houses". Each fashion house is expected to assemble a cohesive fashion show for each episode, from the ground up, including everything from the lighting, music, the set, and the fashions.

Simply called The Fashion Show during the show's first season, the second season's restyled title is The Fashion Show: Ultimate Collection.

Season 2 premiered on November 9 at 10:00 pm/9:00 pm central, and features 12 designers competing to create the ultimate collection and for the chance to win $125,000 provided by TRESemme Professional Hair Care.

In one episode, Calvin Tran declares about having to work with other contestants, "Oh, here go hell come!"  It became widely ridiculed on The Soup.

Season 1 contestants

Season 1 challenges

: Team 1, consisting of Angel, James-Paul, Lidia, Merlin are selected as the top team. But Lidia is chosen as the individual winner of this challenge and wins an immunity.
: Team 3, consisting of Haven, Johnny R., and Reco, are selected as the top team. But Johnny R. is chosen as the individual winner of this challenge.
: The remaining eight contestants are separated into four teams consisting of: Anna & Haven; Johnny R. & Merlin; Lidia & James-Paul; and Daniella & Reco. The four teams each create one outfit.
: The remaining four contestants presented an entire collection on the runway from which the judges choose three to be voted upon by the show's viewers.

 (WINNER) Designer was chosen by viewers as the winner of The Fashion Show.
 [(1ST) RUNNER-UP] Designer came in second place in the votes.
 [(2ND) RUNNER-UP] Designer came in third place in the votes.
 (FINALIST) Designer was selected by judges as a finalist to be voted on by viewers.
 (WIN) Designer was selected by judges as the winner of the challenge.
 (HIGH) Designer had one of the best designs determined by fashion show audience.
 (LOW) Designer had one of the worst designs determined by fashion show audience.
 (LOW) Designer was in the bottom two.
 (OUT) Designer was eliminated.
 (QUIT) Designer voluntarily left the competition.
 (SAFE) Designer was declared safe; team was in the middle of the pack.
 [SAFE1] Designer was on the winning team.
 [SAFE2] Designer was on the losing team.

Entries in bold text indicate that the designer was team leader that week.
: Teams were disbanded on Week 4, thus rendering it an individual competition from there on out.

Season 2 contestants
Elimination order
 Francine Simmons
 Mike Vensel (quit)*
 Tamara Jones
 Rolando "Ro" Tamez
 Golnessa Farmanara
 David Caldwell
 Cindy Ayvar
 Eduardo de las Casas
 Cesar Gallindo
 Dominique Pearl David
 Calvin Tran
 Jeffrey Williams

Season 2 challenges

 (WINNER) Designer was chosen by viewers as the winner of The Fashion Show.
 [(1ST) RUNNER-UP] Designer placed second in the voting.
 [(2ND) RUNNER-UP] Designer placed third in the voting.
 (WIN) Designer was selected by judges as the winner of the challenge.
 (HIGH) Designer had one of the best designs determined by the judges.
 (LOW) Designer was in the bottom two.
 (OUT) Designer was eliminated.
 (QUIT) Designer voluntarily left the competition.
 [SAFE1] Designer was on the winning team.
 [SAFE2] Designer was on the losing team.

: In Week 2, House of Emerald Syx was renamed House of Emerald.
: In Week 7, designers were randomly paired by taking rings (diamond, gold or platinum) out of a bag.

References

External links
 

Bravo (American TV network) original programming
2000s American reality television series
2009 American television series debuts
2010s American reality television series
2011 American television series endings
Television series by Fremantle (company)
Fashion-themed television series
English-language television shows
Reality competition television series